Tarapaya is one of the cantons of the Potosí Municipality, the capital municipality of the Tomás Frías Province in the Potosí Department of Bolivia. During the census of 2001 it had 1,042 inhabitants. Its seat is Tarapaya with a population of 11 in 2001. It is situated east of Tarapaya River.

Ojo del Inca 
Being close to Potosí the thermal springs called "Ojo del Inca" (Eye of the Inca) in Tarapaya are often visited by tourists.

See also 
 Lik'ichiri

References

External links 
 Potosí Municipality: population data and map (PDF; 722 kB) (Spanish)

Cantons of Potosí Department
Cantons of Bolivia